Lepidammodytes macrophthalmus is a species of sand lance endemic to the Pacific Ocean waters around Hawaii. This species grows to a length of  SL. This species is the only known member of its genus. According to the U.S. Forest Service, it "is characterized by having strongly ctenoidscales, larger eyes, perforated lacrymals, and a moderate number of vertebrae".

References

Ammodytidae
Fish described in 1994
Fish of Hawaii